Billy Nicholson may refer to:

 Billy Nicholson (ice hockey) (1878–1947), Canadian ice hockey player and executive
 Billy Nicholson (politician) (born 1948), American politician and former insurance agent from Mississippi

See also
Bill Nicholson (disambiguation)
William Nicholson (disambiguation)